James J. MacKean was an Irish politician. He was a Cumann na nGaedheal member of the Free State Seanad Éireann from 1922 to 1936. He was first elected to the Seanad in 1922 for 9 years and was re-elected in 1931 for 9 years. He served until the Free State Seanad was abolished in 1936.

References

Year of birth missing
Year of death missing
Cumann na nGaedheal senators
Fine Gael senators
Members of the 1922 Seanad
Members of the 1925 Seanad
Members of the 1928 Seanad
Members of the 1931 Seanad
Members of the 1934 Seanad